The UFO Incident is a 1975 American made-for-television biographical film starring James Earl Jones and Estelle Parsons based on the alleged 1961 alien abduction of Barney and Betty Hill.

Plot 
The film introduces us to Barney and Betty Hill, two ordinary people who have had the most extraordinary experience. She is a social worker and he a postman. They are an interracial couple who are very happy with each other, but they are perplexed by a traumatic experience of which they have no memory.

Two years later, they are still tormented by what happened during a trip where they have a mysterious lapse of memory which takes place after sighting a strange object hovering over their car. They wake up some time later much farther down the road.

Barney and Betty consult psychiatrist Doctor Benjamin Simon, who tries to help them find the answer. The doctor decides that the best treatment to unlock their case of double amnesia is hypnosis. Doctor Simon mentions that Barney has suffered from a childhood of racial strife and feels deep guilt about his divorce. Barney tells the doctor that he has had physical symptoms after the experience such as strange warts on his groin. They are both tormented by mysterious nightmares that Betty begins to document.

They report the incident to the US Air Force (the US Air Force at the time had a project relating to UFO sightings called Project Blue Book).

Doctor Simon places Barney under hypnosis and he begins to relive the experience. Barney describes his and Betty's seeing a strange object in the sky that begins to follow and then to terrify them. Barney begins screaming in horror during the session as he describes his and Betty's being abducted by the aliens from the UFO. Betty also reacts with horror describing their captive experience. She and Barney are subjected to disturbing medical experiments by the aliens, such as Betty having a needle shoved into her navel.

With Doctor Simon's assistance and their strong love for each other, Barney and Betty are able to come to terms with their experience and get on with their lives.

At the end of the film, it is revealed that Barney died of a stroke in 1969 at the age of 46. Betty lived on until 2004.

Main cast
 James Earl Jones as Barney Hill
 Estelle Parsons as Betty Hill
 Barnard Hughes as Dr. Benjamin Simon
 Dick O'Neill as Gen. James Davison
 Beeson Carroll as Lt. Col. Jack MacRainey
 Terrence O'Conner as Lisa MacRainey
 Jeanne Joe as "Examiner"
 Lou Wagner as "The Leader"

Releases 
On , Kino Lorber Studio Classics released a 2K remaster of the film on Blu-ray (Region A), including bonus features such as a commentary by filmmaker and historian Gary Gerani, a documentary about the film's music composer Billy Goldenberg, and optional English subtitles (SDH).

Possible remake 
In 2011, The Huffington Post reported that a more developed and detailed film depicting the events of the Hill couple's alleged encounter and abduction was being pursued as a possible project that could give a better insight to the incident. The film was to be based on the book Captured! The Betty and Barney Hill UFO Experience (2007) by Stanton Friedman and Kathleen Marden.

Historic context

See also

References

Bibliography

External links 
 

1975 television films
1975 films
1970s biographical films
American biographical films
Alien abduction in television
Alien abduction films
Films about interracial romance
Films set in New Hampshire
Films set in 1961
NBC network original films
Films directed by Richard A. Colla
Films scored by Billy Goldenberg
UFO-related television
1970s American films